

Historical and architectural interest bridges

References 
 

 Others references

See also 

 Geography of Lebanon
 Transport in Lebanon
 Rail transport in Lebanon
 List of Roman bridges

Lebanon

Bridges
b